His Majesty's hired armed brig Pitt served the British Royal Navy between 1809 and 1812, primarily on the Brazil station. There are no readily available records describing the brig, or her service. She may have been the merchantman . Admiralty records in the form of logbooks for the hired armed brig do exist so original research would provide more information. 

Pitts service predates 1809. They reached Funchal Bay on 27 March. There they patrolled the vicinity for three days, looking for enemy vessels, and then sailed for the Cape Verde Islands. For a day or so Agamemnon towed Pitt, which was quite slow. They reached Praia, and then sailed across the Atlantic, reaching Guanabara Bay on 14 May.

Captain Fabian of Mutine broke out bunting and the British vessels saluted the revolution with salvos of cannon. Fabian also gave a rousing speech on liberty and revolution, praising the revolutionaries for having gained their freedom. One source gives the name of Pitts commander as Lieutenant Thomas P. Perkins, but a newspaper account for March 1811 gives it as Lieutenant W. Perkins. On 28 May Pitt sailed to Rio de Janeiro with the news of the uprising. Mutine sailed for Britain with the same news on 3 June.

Citations and references
Citations

References

 

1800s ships
Hired armed vessels of the Royal Navy